Colin Raak (born 21 April 2000) is a German footballer who plays as a midfielder for NOFV-Oberliga Nord club VfB Krieschow.

Career
Raak made his professional debut for Energie Cottbus in the 3. Liga on 26 January 2019, coming on as a half-time substitute for Jonas Zickert in the 2–3 home loss against Wehen Wiesbaden.

References

External links
 Profile at DFB.de
 

2000 births
Living people
German footballers
Association football midfielders
FC Energie Cottbus players
3. Liga players
Regionalliga players
Oberliga (football) players